This is a list of members of the Victorian Legislative Council at the election of 1 June 1904, up to the election of 4 June 1907. As half of the Legislative Council's terms expired at each triennial election, half of these members were elected at the 1902  election with terms expiring in 1907, while the other half were elected at the 1904 triennial election with terms expiring in 1910.

The Electoral Provinces Boundaries Act 1903 defined 17 Provinces with two members each, with one member for Public and Railway Officers Province making 35 members total.

Note the "Term in Office" refers to that members term(s) in the Council, not necessarily for that Province.

Henry John Wrixon was President; Nicholas Fitzgerald was Chairman of Committees.

 Cuthbert died 5 April 1907; replaced by Frederick Brawn in May 1907.
 Gray died 26 July 1904; replaced by Joseph Henry Abbott in August 1904 who died 10 November 1904; replaced by Alfred Hicks in December 1904
 Irvine resigned September 1906; replaced by Edwin Henry Austin in October 1906.

References

 Re-member (a database of all Victorian MPs since 1851). Parliament of Victoria.

Members of the Parliament of Victoria by term
20th-century Australian politicians